Maj Howardsen (born 12 January 1997) is a Danish swimmer. She competed in the women's 200 metre butterfly event at the 2017 World Aquatics Championships.

References

1997 births
Living people
Danish female swimmers
Place of birth missing (living people)
Danish female butterfly swimmers